Leimebamba (or Leymebamba) is a district of the province of Chachapoyas, located in the northern Peruvian department of Amazonas, in the valley of the Utcubamba River, about 60 kilometers (37 miles) south of Chachapoyas.

Geography
Leimebamba is at approximately 2,000 meters above sea level, and the area is warm with a lush tropical vegetation. Although it can rain anytime of the year, during June to September the weather tends to be dry.

To the north, the Leimebamba District is bordered by San Francisco del Yeso District and Montevideo District, to the east by San Martín Region, to the south by the District of Chuquibamba; and to the west by the District of Balsas.

Leimebamba is located on a mountain near the River Utcubamba.

Villages and hamlets

 Palmira 
 Leymebamba
 Bonda 
 Guilipe
 Muyucsha
 Ishpingo 
 Pomacochas
 Cuensol
 Dos De Mayo
 Plaza Pampa 
 Chururco
 Lluy 
 Llushpe
 Puchicana 
 Checo 
 Teaben 
 Felipa 
 Miraflores
 Santa Dionisia 
 Gramalote Rural
 Amuch
 Parajillo
 Shalcapata
 Shishuayco 
 Potrerillo
 El Salto
 Triguicsa
 El Tambo
 Shonie 
 Monticunga
 Siogue 
 San Miguel
 Timbo Yambo
 Jinez 
 Las Escobas
 Chorrera 
 Sinuno
 Lugar Tranquilo
 Quingrimachay
 Ñushta
 Torongil
 Lajas Bamba 
 Tambillo
 Shival
 La Vaquería
 Monteseco
 La Joya 
 Tajopamba
 Quishuar
 Laguna-C0ndores
 Churo Churo
 Corral Conga 
 Pampas Verdes
 Cabildo Pata
 Atuen
 El Jardín
 Orfedon
 Israel
 Chilingote 
 Agua Loca
 Conjul 
 Chinchango
 Cashapata 

The majority of the villages and hamlets of Leymebamba District are situated in the mountains, some of them are situated near the Utcubamba River.

History
Leimebamba District was legally created on May 3, 1955, during the government of President Manuel A. Odria.

The Incas accompanying Tupac Yupanqui celebrated Inti Raymi in the area, and so named it Raymipampa. From this, the name Leimebamba is derived.

Festivals 
Our Lady of Mount Carmel is the patron saint of Leimebamba town, and a festival in her honour is held on July 16 every year. Celebrations include a special mass, a procession, a festival of local cuisine, street parties and fireworks.

August 28, the Day of Saint Augustine sees another celebration.

Transport
There are two overland approaches to Leimebamba. It is located on the main road between Chachapoyas and Cajamarca, all of which is now paved.

Cajamarca has an airport, and from there it is an 8-hour bus ride to Leimebamba, taking in dramatic and ever-changing scenery, as the road, much of which is single-lane, climbs to a 3,200m (10,500 ft) pass after Celendin, then drops to the town of Balsas on the Marañon River at 850m (2,789 ft), before climbing again to the Barro Negro pass at 3,678m (12,068 ft), before descending again to reach Leimebamba (2,200m / 7,218 ft).

It is only 60 km (37 miles) from Chachapoyas to Leimembamba, along the Utcubamba valley, and public transport takes about two hours to make the journey. However, Chachapoyas does not have a commercial airport, with the nearest one being in Jaen, a 4-hour bus journey away.

Tourist Attractions
Leimebamba District is home to a large number of tourist attractions. The best known of these is the Leymebamba Museum, which contains many of the mummies found at the Laguna de los Condores site, along with their funerary offerings. It also has information about the region's flora and fauna, and a display of quipus found in the area.

The spectacular Laguna de los Condores itself can be visited, either by hike or on horseback. There are also many pre-Inca ruins in the region, such as Congona, Petaca and Diablo Wasi, most of which are thought to have belonged to the Chachapoya culture, but have been little studied. Reaching these ruins can be done on foot, with a selection of one-day and multi-day hikes.

The town of Leimebamba has a small selection of accommodation, and can be used as a base to visit other attractions of Amazonas, such as Revash, Kuelap and Gocta Falls.

Religious 
Leimebamba is a head office of a parish that is served by two Priests from the Roman Catholic Diocese of Chachapoyas.

 Archbishop of Chachapoyas: Monseñor Emiliano Amtonio Cisneros Martínez, OAR.

References

External links

1955 establishments in Peru
States and territories established in 1955
Districts of the Chachapoyas Province
Districts of the Amazonas Region